The Cuban League was a professional baseball league in Cuba from 1878 to 1961.

Cuban League may also refer to:

Cuban National Series, an amateur baseball league in Cuba since 1961

See also
Cuban National League, a former political party in Cuba